Hitchcock House may refer to:

Hitchcock House (Chicago, Illinois)
Reverend George B. Hitchcock House, Cass County, Iowa
George and Martha Hitchcock House, Farwell, Michigan